Sriya Reddy (born 28 November 1983) is an Indian actress who mainly appears in Tamil language films and was also an anchor and VJ. Born to former Indian test cricketer Bharath Reddy, Sriya worked as successful VJ at SS Music before pursuing an acting career as well. Following her debut in Samurai (2002), she appeared in nearly a dozen Tamil, Telugu and Malayalam films, with Black (2004), Thimiru (2006) and Kanchivaram (2008) probably being her best known projects.

Early life
Sriya was born to Bharath Reddy, an Indian cricketer. She did her schooling at Good Shepherd School and went on to study at Ethiraj College Chennai. When she was a child, cricketers Ravi Shastri and Sandeep Patil visited their home and complimented her good voice. During school, she received modelling offers, but had to decline them, since her father wanted her to finish her education first. When she was offered an audition for the leading music channel Southern Spice Music, she was able to convince her father that she would both study and be a VJ.

Career
Sriya, after winning the VJ hunt by SS Music, started hosting shows such as Connect and Phonetastic. However, she cited that she needed five auditions before being selected. She became highly popular as 'VJ Sriya' on SS music, becoming familiar among young viewers. She then accepted her first acting assignment for a Telugu film, in spite of her parents' aversion to her acting in films, citing that she signed the contract when her father was asleep. Her debut release, however, happened to be Balaji Sakthivel's directorial debut Samurai, in which she played a supporting character alongside Vikram. Her maiden Telugu release Appudappudu failed at the box office, following which she did not work in films for over a year. Her next release was in 2004, when she debuted in Malayalam with the Mammootty-starrer Black. She played the role of a young Tamil village woman who comes to town in search of her missing husband, carrying a "thoroughly de-glamourised look" in the film, totally contrary to her real-life look, with director Renjith, on his decision to cast her for the role, citing that she had a "very Dravidian face". Sriya considered this film as her highest point of career for having acted alongside Malayalam actor Mammootty. Later that year, she also starred in an English film named 19 Revolutions, directed by Chicago-based Shridhar Reddy, which featured Sriya as a rich girl who wants to rob her father and did "very well in the US", according to Sriya.

In 2005, she had a single release, the Malayalam action film Bharathchandran I.P.S., which was very successful at the box office. Her performance as an IPS police officer gained positive remarks, with critics comparing her to Vijayashanti. In 2006, she had four film releases, with her two Tamil films gaining most fame. The action flick Thimiru, directed by Tarun Gopi and starring Vishal Krishna, her later brother-in-law, portrayed Sriya as a rustic, loud woman with negative shades, with her performance being widely critically acclaimed. In the other Tamil release, the S. Shankar-produced drama film Veyil, directed by Vasanthabalan, Sriya was part of an ensemble cast featuring Bharath, Pasupathy, Bhavana and Priyanka Nair. The film opened to rave reviews and became acknowledged with several noted film awards, including the National Film Award and two Filmfare Awards. She appeared in a pivotal role in Priyadarshan's art film Kanchivaram, which, too, became highly acclaimed and was honoured with the National Film Award, while Sriya received nominations for the Filmfare Award and the Vijay Award. After completing shooting for the film, she got married and stopped acting.

Eight years later, she made a comeback with a film titled Andaava Kaanom by director Vadivel, in which she will portray an angry village woman Shanthi.

Personal life
Sriya married Tamil actor-producer Vikram Krishna on 9 March 2008 at Park Sheraton hotel in Chennai. Vikram Krishna is the son of veteran film producer G. K. Reddy and brother of actor Vishal Krishna and had starred in a couple of Tamil films, before turning full-time film producer, primarily producing films featuring his brother Vishal in the lead role under his GK Films Corporation. Sriya since has been co-producing films with her husband. The couple have a daughter, Amalia.

Filmography

As producer 
 Thoranai (2009)
 Vedi (2011)

References

External links 
 
 
 

Living people
Indian film actresses
Actresses in Tamil cinema
Actresses in Malayalam cinema
1983 births
21st-century Indian actresses
Telugu actresses
Ethiraj College for Women alumni
Actresses in Telugu cinema
Actresses from Chennai